Nughab Chik (also Romanized as Nūghāb Chīk and Nūqāb Chīk; also known as Naqūchik) is a village in Shakhenat Rural District, in the Central District of Birjand County, South Khorasan Province, Iran. At the 2006 census, its population was 154, in 66 families.

References 

Populated places in Birjand County